The St Joseph's Church or Main Roman Catholic Church of Phnom Penh, Cambodia, is actually a school temporarily transformed into a church until the construction of an actual church. Churches of Phnom Penh were destroyed by the Khmer Rouge and still today there is no proper Roman Catholic Church in Phnom Penh. This school was spared, it offers the possibility to accommodate a large number of people.

Although the majority of the faithful are of Vietnamese descent, the bishop decided that the main liturgies should be celebrated in the Khmer language. Masses are also said in other languages, in which case, the smaller chapel is used. This parish is dedicated to St Joseph.

The church is located about three kilometres north of the city centre, near the Tonle Sap on the N5.

See also 
 Cathedral of Phnom Penh
Chong Khneas Catholic Church

References 

Roman Catholic churches in Cambodia
Phnom Penh